Unas was a king of  ancient Egypt.

Unas may also refer to:

 Ünəş, a village in Azerbaijan
 Unas, a Stargate race
 Universitas Nasional (UNAS), Jakarta, Indonesia

See also

Una (disambiguation), for the singular of plural form unas